Ulolonche modesta, the modest Quaker, is a species of cutworm or dart moth in the family Noctuidae. It is found in North America.

The MONA or Hodges number for Ulolonche modesta is 10569.

References

Further reading

 
 
 

Eriopygini
Articles created by Qbugbot
Moths described in 1874